Ángeles sin paraíso (English title: Angels without paradise) is a Mexican Children's telenovela produced by Pedro Damián for Televisa in 1992. This telenovela is remembered by the public as one of the first children's Mexican telenovela.

Anahí and Felipe Colombo starred as child protagonists, while Patricia Bernal starred as main antagonist.

Cast 

Anahí as Claudia Cifuentes
Felipe Colombo as Andrés Cifuentes
Patricia Bernal as Aurora Sombría
Evita Muñoz "Chachita" as Asunción "Mamá Chonita"
Fernando Balzaretti as Morrongo
Eduardo Cassab as Mustiales
Luis de Icaza as Juan
Josefina Echánove as Lucia
Beatriz Moreno as Antonia "Toña" Ortíz
Manuel Landeta as Abelardo Cifuentes
Serrana as Martha Galicia de Cifuentes
Carmelita González as Amalia
Raquel Pankowsky as Brígida
Jorge Poza as Chato
Diego Luna as Móises
Salvador Garcini as Zorro
Mónika Sánchez as Andrea
Gonzalo Sánchez as Matías
Fabiola Falcón as Filomena
Darío T. Pie as Urbano
Amparo Arozamena as Martina
Abraham Stavans as Dr. Gálvez
Irving Montaño as Sófocles
Juan Carlos Mendoza as Pedro
Jesús Ochoa
Michelle Renaud
Angélica Vale 
Eugenio Polgovsky

References

External links

1992 telenovelas
Mexican telenovelas
1992 Mexican television series debuts
1993 Mexican television series endings
Spanish-language telenovelas
Television shows set in Mexico
Televisa telenovelas
Children's telenovelas
Television series about children